Nazario Padrón Arencibia (born 16 October 1945) is a Spanish former breaststroke swimmer. He competed in two events at the 1964 Summer Olympics.

Notes

References

External links
 

1945 births
Living people
Spanish male breaststroke swimmers
Olympic swimmers of Spain
Swimmers at the 1964 Summer Olympics
Mediterranean Games medalists in swimming
Mediterranean Games bronze medalists for Spain
Swimmers at the 1967 Mediterranean Games
Universiade medalists in swimming
Universiade silver medalists for Spain
Sportspeople from Las Palmas
Medalists at the 1963 Summer Universiade
Swimmers at the 1963 Mediterranean Games
20th-century Spanish people